Lawson is an EP released by the four-piece British band Lawson. It was released on 9 October 2015 via Polydor Records.

Background and release
In March 2015, Lawson announced via social media that their second studio album was complete. In an interview with Capital FM, Brown said "The writing and recording process at Blackbird Studios in Nashville allowed us to test ourselves and try new sounds and directions," he added. "We're really proud of it."
The lead single “Roads” was released in May 2015.

In May, the album was delayed due to Brown’s liver failure. 
 In September, the band resumed work on their second studio album and said it is due out later this year or early next via Polydor Records. In the meantime, a self-titled extended play was released in October, containing new songs and previously released singles.

Singles
The first single released from the Lawson EP is "Roads", which came out on 24 May 2015.

The second single is "Under The Sun", released on 23 October 2015.

Track listing

Charts

References

Polydor Records EPs
2015 EPs
Lawson (band) albums